Sura pyrocera is a moth of the family Sesiidae. It is known from Malawi and Mozambique.

References

Sesiidae
Lepidoptera of Mozambique
Lepidoptera of Malawi
Moths of Sub-Saharan Africa
Moths described in 1919